Karim Johannes Jallow (born April 13, 1997) is a German professional basketball player for ratiopharm Ulm of the German Basketball Bundesliga.

Early life 
Jallow was born in Munich, Germany as the first child of a German mother and a Gambian father. He first began playing soccer but picked up basketball at age 9, joining the FC Bayern Munich under-10 team and often playing outdoor basketball with his father. Growing up, Jallow looked up to Kobe Bryant but expressed admiration for Giannis Antetokounmpo later in his career.

Professional career 
On July 14, 2015, Jallow signed his first professional contract with FC Bayern Munich of the Basketball Bundesliga.

On July 3, 2017, Jallow extended his contract with Bayern Munich until 2020. Team manager Marko Pešić said, "Karim is one of our biggest talents; he still hasn't stopped developing." On April 13, 2018, Jallow entered the 2018 NBA draft.

For the 2018–19 season, Bayern sent Jallow on loan to MHP Riesen Ludwigsburg.

In July 2019, Jallow signed a three-year contract with Basketball Löwen Braunschweig.

On June 28, 2021, he has signed with ratiopharm Ulm of the German Basketball Bundesliga.

References 

1997 births
Living people
Basketball Löwen Braunschweig players
FC Bayern Munich basketball players
German men's basketball players
German people of Gambian descent
German sportspeople of African descent
Ratiopharm Ulm players
Riesen Ludwigsburg players
Shooting guards